The 2019 Copa Sudamericana first stage was played from 5 February to 8 May 2019. A total of 44 teams competed in the first stage to decide 22 of the 32 places in the second stage of the 2019 Copa Sudamericana.

Draw

The draw for the first stage was held on 17 December 2018, 20:30 PYST (UTC−3), at the CONMEBOL Convention Centre in Luque, Paraguay. For the first stage, the teams were divided into two pots according to their geographical zones:
Pot A (South Zone): 22 teams from Argentina, Bolivia, Chile, Paraguay, and Uruguay
Pot B (North Zone): 22 teams from Brazil, Colombia, Ecuador, Peru, and Venezuela

The 44 teams were drawn into 22 ties (E1–E22) between a team from Pot A and a team from Pot B, with the teams from Pot B hosting the second leg in odd-numbered ties, and the teams from Pot A hosting the second leg in even-numbered ties. This distribution ensured that teams from the same association could not be drawn into the same tie.

Notes

Format

In the first stage, each tie was played on a home-and-away two-legged basis. If tied on aggregate, the away goals rule was used. If still tied, extra time was not played, and a penalty shoot-out was used to determine the winner (Regulations Article 27).

The 22 winners of the first stage advanced to the second stage to join the 10 teams transferred from the Copa Libertadores (two best teams eliminated in the third stage of qualifying and eight third-placed teams in the group stage).

Matches
The first legs were played on 5–7, 12–14, 26 February, 19–21 March and 2–4 April, and the second legs were played on 19–21, 26–28 February, 21 March, 16–18, 30 April, 1–2 and 8 May 2019.

|}

Match E1

Montevideo Wanderers won 3–1 on aggregate and advanced to the second stage.

Match E2

Liverpool won 1–0 on aggregate and advanced to the second stage.

Match E3

Independiente won 6–2 on aggregate and advanced to the second stage.

Match E4

Tied 2–2 on aggregate, Rionegro Águilas won on penalties and advanced to the second stage.

Match E5

Argentinos Juniors won 2–1 on aggregate and advanced to the second stage.

Match E6

Colón won 5–0 on aggregate and advanced to the second stage.

Match E7

Tied 2–2 on aggregate, Unión Española won on penalties and advanced to the second stage.

Match E8

Cerro won 4–2 on aggregate and advanced to the second stage.

Match E9

Deportivo Santaní won 3–1 on aggregate and advanced to the second stage.

Match E10

Tied 1–1 on aggregate, Universidad Católica won on penalties and advanced to the second stage.

Match E11

Tied 1–1 on aggregate, River Plate won on away goals and advanced to the second stage.

Match E12

Macará won 5–1 on aggregate and advanced to the second stage.

Match E13

Tied 3–3 on aggregate, Royal Pari won on penalties and advanced to the second stage.

Match E14

Tied 1–1 on aggregate, Sol de América won on penalties and advanced to the second stage.

Match E15

Tied 1–1 on aggregate, Unión La Calera won on away goals and advanced to the second stage.

Match E16

Tied 1–1 on aggregate, Deportivo Cali won on penalties and advanced to the second stage.

Match E17

Tied 1–1 on aggregate, Zulia won on penalties and advanced to the second stage.

Match E18

Tied 2–2 on aggregate, Corinthians won on penalties and advanced to the second stage.

Match E19

Tied 0–0 on aggregate, La Equidad won on penalties and advanced to the second stage.

Match E20

Fluminense won 2–1 on aggregate and advanced to the second stage.

Match E21

Tied 2–2 on aggregate, Independiente del Valle won on penalties and advanced to the second stage.

Match E22

Botafogo won 4–0 on aggregate and advanced to the second stage.

Notes

References

External links
CONMEBOL Sudamericana 2019, CONMEBOL.com

1
February 2019 sports events in South America
March 2019 sports events in South America
April 2019 sports events in South America
May 2019 sports events in South America